The Preserve at Sharp Mountain may refer to:

Places
 Sharp Mountain Preserve, Georgia, a gated community in Pickens County, North Georgia USA
 The Preserve, a 963-acre open space preserve in Connecticut USA.

See also
 Sharp Mountain, in eastern central Pennsylvania USA.